Christian Ebisike was an Anglican bishop in Nigeria: he was the Bishop Emeritus of Ngbo.

He was abducted forcibly in 2010 and held for one day.

He died in 2018.

Notes

2018 deaths
Anglican bishops of Ngbo
21st-century Anglican bishops in Nigeria
Year of birth missing